Charles Ernest Hosking Jr. (May 12, 1924 – March 21, 1967) was a United States Army Special Forces soldier who received the U.S. military's highest decoration, the Medal of Honor, for his actions in the Vietnam War. He was awarded the medal posthumously for holding a Viet Cong prisoner with a live grenade, taking the brunt of the blast rather than allowing the prisoner to reach several of his commanders.

Biography 
Born on May 12, 1924, in Ramsey, New Jersey, Hosking left high school to join the Canadian Army in 1941 when he was 16 years old and was discharged one month later for being underage. With his grandfathers permission, he joined the U.S. Coast Guard at the age of 17. After serving beach patrol duties he was discharged from the Coast Guard because of a heart condition in December 1942. Still wanting to serve and with the assistance of his congressman he was inducted into the Army on May 1, 1943. During World War II, Hosking served first with the 69th Infantry Division, then with the 509th Parachute Infantry Battalion. He served in Vietnam as a sergeant first class in Company A of the 5th Special Forces Group (Airborne), 1st Special Forces Regiment. On March 21, 1967, he was working as an advisor to a Civilian Irregular Defense Group battalion in Đôn Luân district, Phuoc Long Province, when a Viet Cong sniper was captured. As Hosking prepared to transport the prisoner to base camp, the man grabbed a hand grenade from Hosking's belt, armed it, and ran towards the 4-man company command group. Hosking tackled the prisoner and held him to the ground, using the prisoner's body and his own to shield others from the grenade blast. Both he and the Viet Cong prisoner were killed in the ensuing explosion. Hosking was posthumously promoted to master sergeant and awarded the Medal of Honor for this action.

Medal of Honor citation
Hosking's official Medal of Honor citation reads:

For conspicuous gallantry and intrepidity in action at the risk of his life above and beyond the call of duty. Master Sergeant Hosking (then Sergeant First Class), Detachment A-302, Company A, greatly distinguished himself while serving as company advisor in the III Corps Civilian Irregular Defense Group Reaction Battalion during combat operations in Don Luan District. A Viet Cong suspect was apprehended and subsequently identified as a Viet Cong sniper. While MSG Hosking was preparing the enemy for movement back to the base camp, the prisoner suddenly grabbed a hand grenade from MSG Hosking's belt, armed the grenade, and started running towards the company command group which consisted of 2 Americans and 2 Vietnamese who were standing a few feet away. Instantly realizing that the enemy intended to kill the other men, MSG Hosking immediately leaped upon the Viet Cong's back. With utter disregard for his personal safety, he grasped the Viet Cong in a "Bear Hug" forcing the grenade against the enemy soldier's chest. He then wrestled the Viet Cong to the ground and covered the enemy's body with his body until the grenade detonated. The blast instantly killed both MSG Hosking and the Viet Cong. By absorbing the full force of the exploding grenade with his body and that of the enemy, he saved the other members of his command group from death or serious injury. MSG Hosking's risk of his life above and beyond the call of duty are in the highest tradition of the U.S. Army and reflect great credit upon himself and the Armed Forces of his country.

Other honors

After Hosking's death, the Special Forces compound at Bien Hoa, RVN was named C.E. "Snake" Hosking Compound.
Hosking was buried at Valleau Cemetery in Ridgewood, New Jersey. Hosking Field House was dedicated in his memory in May 1971 at Fort Bragg, North Carolina. Hosking Way, a road off of Darlington Avenue in Ramsey, New Jersey is named in his honor. His name is on the Vietnam Veterans Memorial wall at Panel 17E, Line 5. Hosking is memorialized in a plaque at Veterans Park in his hometown of Ramsey.

See also

List of Medal of Honor recipients for the Vietnam War

Notes

References

Bibliography

External links 
 

1924 births
1967 deaths
People from Ramsey, New Jersey
United States Army non-commissioned officers
Members of the United States Army Special Forces
American military personnel killed in the Vietnam War
United States Army Medal of Honor recipients
Vietnam War recipients of the Medal of Honor
Deaths by hand grenade
United States Coast Guard personnel of World War II
United States Army personnel of World War II
United States Army personnel of the Vietnam War